Gmina Moszczenica may refer to either of the following rural administrative districts in Poland:
Gmina Moszczenica, Lesser Poland Voivodeship
Gmina Moszczenica, Łódź Voivodeship